David Bruce Smith is an author, editor, publisher and business executive based in Washington, DC. He is the founder and president of The Grateful American Foundation, an organization dedicated to restoring enthusiasm in American history for kids and adults.  Smith has been a guest blogger for Maryland Humanities, the National Museum of Women in the Arts, and Historic Deerfield. He also co-authors a bi-weekly column, History Matters, with John Grimaldi; and newsletters for his Grateful American Foundation, and David Bruce Smith Publications.

Early life and family
David Bruce Smith is the son of Robert H. Smith, a builder developer, philanthropist and former President of the National Gallery of Art. His mother is the world-renowned artist Clarice Chasen Smith. His grandfather was the real estate developer and philanthropist Charles E. Smith. Smith’s book Conversations with Papa Charlie is a memoir of the close relationship he had with his grandfather.

He holds a Bachelor of Arts in American Literature from George Washington University and a Master of Arts in Journalism from New York University.

Career
Smith worked at the Charles E. Smith Realty Companies for two decades, progressing from a property management job in the Residential division, to vice-president and senior vice president positions in commercial management. He then switched to a career in writing, editing, and publishing. He founded, edited and published Crystal City Magazine.

David Bruce Smith Publications was founded in 2003. The company specializes in creating, designing, and writing limited-edition books on a variety of subjects such as authors, historic figures, artists and leaders.

Smith is the author of thirteen books: In Many Arenas, 13 Young Men, Tennessee, Three Miles from Providence, Conversations with Papa Charlie, Afternoon Tea with Mom, Letters to My Children, Building the Community, Continuum, Building My Life, Souvenirs of the Riviera and the children's book American Hero: John Marshall, Chief Justice of the United States and Abigail & John. He is also a reviewer of books for several publications. Smith also authored the preface of American Council of Trustees and Alumni (ACTA) booklet, "No U.S. History?"

In 2014 he launched The Grateful American Series, an interactive multimedia program designed to restore enthusiasm in American history for children and adults.

The Grateful American Foundation, which focuses on publishing materials and producing activities for children about American History, was founded in 2014.

Grateful American Book Prize
In March 2015 Smith co-founded the Grateful American Book Prize, with Dr. Bruce Cole, the former chairman of the National Endowment for the Humanities. The annual award will honor a single 7th-9th grade level work culled from fiction, historical fiction, and non-fiction entries.

The Prize consists of a $13,000 cash award in commemoration of the 13 original Colonies. In addition, the winner receives a silver medal designed by Smith’s mother, the renowned artist Clarice Smith.

The inaugural winner, announced at President Lincoln's Cottage in Washington, was Kathy Cannon Wiechman for her Civil War novel, Like a River. It was the author's first book. 2015 Honorable Mentions were Michaela MacColl's The Revelation of Louisa May and Darlene Beck Jacobson's Wheels of Change.

2016's Grateful American Book Prize was presented to Chris Stevenson at the Library of Congress for his Revolutionary War novel, The Drum of Destiny.
"Honorable Mentions" went to Michaela MacColl's and Rosemary Nichols's, Freedom's Price, and Laura Amy Schlitz's, The Hired Girl.

2017's Grateful American Book Prize was given to Margot Lee Shetterly at Washington, DC's National Archives for Hidden Figures, a true story of four African American women, hired by NASA in the mid-twentieth century, to be "human" computers. "Honorable Mentions" went to Jennifer Latham for Dreamland Burning, and Edward Cody Huddleston's, The Story of John Quincy Adams 250 Years After His Birth.

2018's Grateful American Book Prize was given to L. M. Elliott at the Society of the Cincinnati for the Cold War-themed, Suspect Red. A double-winner, she also received one of the two "Honorable Mentions" for Hamilton and Peggy! A Revolutionary Friendship; the other was presented to Teri Kanefield for Andrew Jackson: The History of America.

2019's Grateful American Book Prize was presented to Sonia Sotomayor at the Corcoran School of the Arts and Design, Washington, DC, for her memoir, The Beloved World of Sonia Sotomayor. “Honorable Mentions" went to Henry Louis Gates Jr., and Tonya Bolden for Dark Sky Rising: Reconstruction And The Dawning Of Jim Crow, and to Mike Winchell for The Electric War: Edison, Tesla, Westinghouse, and the Race To Light The World.

2020’s Grateful American Book Prize was presented, virtually, to Sharon Robinson, for Child of the Dream: A Memoir of 1963. "Honorable Mentions" went to Alan Gratz for "Allies," and Larry Dane Brimmer for Accused! The Trials of the Scottsboro Boys: Lies,  Prejudice, and the Fourteenth Amendment.

2021's Grateful American Book Prize was given virtually to Alan Gratz for Ground Zero: A Novel of 9/11, while "Honorable Mentions" went to Chris Stevenson's The Cannon of Courage: Gabriel Cooper & the Noble Train of Artillery, and Michaela MacColl's View From Pagoda Hill.

2022's Grateful American Book Prize was presented at the Perry Belmont House, in Washington DC, to Michelle Coles for her debut novel, Black Was the Ink, while "Honorable Mentions" went to Gail Jarrow for Ambushed! The Assassination Plot Against President Garfield, and Tonya Bolden for Speak Up! Speak Out!: The Extraordinary Life of Fighting Shirley Chisholm.

Grateful American Book Series

The book series concentrates on historical couples that were—in actuality—an equal partnership. The first is Abigail & John (Adams), published in August, 2019.

Philanthropy
Smith established a scholarship fund for undergraduate students at George Washington University.

In 2009 he helped to establish "Jewish Literature Live" at George Washington University. The course on contemporary Jewish American works of literature allows students to study and interact with prominent Jewish American authors. Renowned writer and George Washington University professor Faye Moskowitz taught the course.

The Gettysburg Foundation began the David Bruce Smith Education Initiative in 2009, a decade of public programs and educational opportunities that highlight Abraham Lincoln's presidency  and legacy. The Robert H. Smith Family Foundation supports the initiative.

Memberships and affiliations
He is President of the National Institute of Psychobiology in Jerusalem, Israel, a member of the Advisory Board at the Sixth and I Historic Synagogue and a member of the Board of Advisors for the Washington Independent Review of Books. He co-judged Moment Magazine's Jewish Literature Award, 2012.

Smith joined the Foundation Board at the Virginia Museum of Fine Arts in 2014; in 2015, he was elected to the Board of the Smithsonian Libraries. He also served on the board of the Washington, DC Jewish Community Center, Arena Stage, and President Lincoln's Cottage. In 2017 Smith was appointed to the History News Network Board. In 2018, Smith was elected to the board of Restless Books. Smith has been a board member of the American Council of Trustees and Alumni (ACTA) since 2017 and a board member of the Supreme Court Historical Society and the Wilmer Eye Institute at Johns Hopkins Medicine since 2022. He is also a former member of George Washington University and WETA's Board of Directors.

Awards and honors
In 2012 Smith received the Ottenstein Award for Community Service from the Jewish Social Services Agency of Washington, DC. He received the Hymen Goldman Humanitarian award in 2013 from the Hebrew Home of Greater Washington, and an honorary fellowship from Hebrew University in Jerusalem.

References

External links
David Bruce Smith Publications
Grateful American™ Foundation
Grateful American™ Book Prize
Grateful American™ Book Series
Washington Independent Review of Books
David Bruce Smith on Amazon
Historic Deerfield
History Matters

American non-fiction writers
Columbian College of Arts and Sciences alumni
American Jews
American publishers (people)
Writers from Washington, D.C.
Living people
New York University alumni
Year of birth missing (living people)
Smith family (real estate)